Psychroflexus salis  is a Gram-negative, strictly aerobic and non-motile bacteria from the genus of Psychroflexus which has been isolated from the Lake Xiaochaidan in the Qinghai Province in China. 5

References

Further reading

External links
Type strain of Psychroflexus salis at BacDive -  the Bacterial Diversity Metadatabase

Flavobacteria
Bacteria described in 2016